Laila Majnu  is a 1949 Telugu-language historical romance film, based on the Sufi legend of Laila-Majnu. It is  produced and directed by  P. S. Ramakrishna Rao under the Bharani Pictures banner. It stars Bhanumathi and Akkineni Nageswara Rao, with music composed by  C. R. Subburaman. The film was simultaneously released in Tamil with same title. The film was successful at the box office.

Plot
Laila (Bhanumathi Ramakrishna) is the daughter of Ameer Sarvaar (Mukkamala) and Khais (Akkineni Nageswara Rao), the son of Ameer Umri (Arani Satyanarayana). Love blossoms between Laila and Khais as they grow up. Ameer Sarvaar, unable to dissuade his daughter from seeing Khais, shifts to Mecca. Khais follows her to Mecca and roams in the streets uttering her name. People take him to be a mad person (Majnu) and throw stones at him. The story takes a lot of twists and turns from here on. The King of Iraq (C.S.R.), who comes on a visit to Mecca, sees Laila and decides to marry her. Meanwhile, Ameer Umri pleads with his erstwhile friend Sarvaar to save his son. Sarvaar agrees to get his daughter married to Khais if it is proved that he is not mad. A test is conducted and Khais emerges successful. Just when the marriage is to be performed, Sarvaar receives a proposal from the King of Iraq that he wishes to marry Laila. Sarvaar changes his mind, and performs his daughter's marriage with the King. Laila leaves for Iraq and Khais wanders aimlessly in the desert. The King already has a mistress Zareena (Sriranjani Jr.). On coming to know of Laila's story, she tries to help her. Soon thereafter, the Prince repents, calls Laila his sister and sends her back to Khais. The lovers are about to meet in the desert, but fate wills it otherwise and a heavy sandstorm takes its toll.

Cast
Cast according to the opening credits of the film:

 Bhanumathi as Laila
 Nageswara Rao as Khayas (Majnu)

Male cast
 C. S. R. as Rakkin Prabhu
 Siva Rao as Anwar
 Krishnamurthy as Amir Sarvar
 Aarani as Amir Zamri
 Seetharam as Moulvi
 K. V. Subba Rao as Kubla Khan
 Chitti Babu as Young Khayas
 Dumbachari as Raheem

Female cast
 Sriranjani (Junior) as Zarina
 Hemalatha as Begum
 Surabhi Balasaraswathi as Zohrah
 Baby Krishnaveni as Young Laila
 Vimala Devi as Zuguna
 Annapoorna Devi as Moulvi's Wife
Dance
 Lalitha-Padmini

Production
Laila Majnu, an ancient epic of love, is an integral part of classic Sufi literature. Hashmet Shah has told it, so has Amir Khusro. Nizami Ganjavi's 12th century version in scintillating verse filled with allegorical flourishes has been translated into numerous languages. Mian Mohammad Bakhsh's interpretation of the epic is held as an acclaimed treatise in Pakistan till this day. The tragic tale of Majnoon and Laila is said to have its foundations in true events that occurred in the 7th century.

With his first film, Rathnamala, turning a box office hit, studio owner and director Ramakrishna was on the lookout for a suitable subject for Bharani's next venture. Fascinated by the first Hindi talkie version of Laila Majnu (1945), which he had seen in Bombay, he made the choice. His production chief D. L. Narayana agreed with him. A screening of the Hindi version was arranged for his actress-wife Bhanumathi and Akkineni Nageswara Rao, whom he had thought of for the protagonist's role. Samudrala Raghavacharya was assigned the job of writing the script and the dialogue.

The sandstorm scene especially is worth mentioning. Instead of veteran cameraman Jiten Banerjee, who cranked for Rathnamala, Ramakrishna took B. S. Ranga as the cameraman without even knowing how efficient his work was. Ranga who bagged this assignment thanks to his brother Garudachari, a close friend of Ramakrishna, proved his worth and it was the turning point in his future life and career. Besides excellent photography, sound designing (by V. Srinivasa Raghavan under whom later day's popular director K. Viswanath worked as an assistant), the period sets created by art directors Goadgoankar and K. Nageswara Rao.

Vedantam Raghavayya choreographed the songs. Samudrala Sr gave the story, dialogue, and lyrics. Cinematography is performed by B. S. Ranga. The film is presented by P. Bhanumathi under Bharani Pictures.

Soundtrack

Music composed by C. R. Subburaman. All the tunes for all the songs and singers for both languages are the same. Singers are P. Bhanumathi & Kasturi Siva Rao. Playback singers are Ghantasala, S. Dakshinamurthi, Madhavapeddi Satyam R. Balasaraswathi Devi, P. Leela & Jikki.

Music released on AVM Audio Company.

Telugu songs
Lyrics by Samudrala Sr. The song "Preme Neramouna" is an evergreen blockbuster.

Tamil songs
Lyrics by S. D. Sundharam.

Critical reception
An article published in the Hindu wrote about this movie, "While the opulent palace, garden and other sets were put up in the floor, the desert set with a pond, palm trees (to resemble date trees found in deserts) and sand dunes were created in the open space between the studio and the recording theatre and the scenes were shot there during the nights for the right effect. The result of this entire effort was reflected in audience's appreciation of the movie."

Trivia

Laila Majnu was first made as a silent film in 1922 by J. J. Madan and again in 1927 by Manilal Joshi. Noted filmmaker Kanjibhai Rathod made it in Hindi in 1931 after the films became talkies. J. J. Madan remade it in Hindi in 1931. In 1936, it was produced by East India Pictures in Persian. In 1940, Dharmaveer Singh made the same story in Punjabi, and in 1941, Sarnad Pictures made a version in Pushtu language. In 1945 it was made in Hindi featuring Swaran Lata as Leila and Nazir Ahmed as Majnu. It was a box office hit.

This version made by Bhanumathi was dubbed into Tamil and released simultaneously with the Telugu version. S. D. Sundharam wrote the dialogues and lyrics for the Tamil version. F. Nagoor made another Laila Majnu in 1950 under the banner Balaji Pictures and shot at Newtone studios with T. R. Mahalingam and M. V. Rajamma . The story was again made in 1953, 1976 (in Hindi and Bengali), and later in 1982.

Notes

References

External links
 
  (Tamil)

1949 films
1940s Telugu-language films
Films scored by C. R. Subbaraman
Films directed by P. S. Ramakrishna Rao
Indian historical films
1940s historical films